Skirbeck is a suburb and former civil parish in the Borough of Boston in the county of Lincolnshire, England. Skirbeck is a long v-shaped formation wrapped around the south and east side of Boston parish. It has been incorporated into the Borough of Boston since 1932. It is in the Pilgrim ward of the Boston Borough Council.  Skirbeck includes the hamlet and former civil parish of Skirbeck Quarter which was on the west side of the River Witham and was a separate parish from 1866 to 1932.

History
That name originates from the words "skirn" and "bekkr" meaning "clear stream". 
Skirbeck appears in two entries in the Domesday Book of 1086, when it was recorded as consisting of a total of 42 households and had two churches and two fisheries.

St Leonards Hospital for ten poor people, was founded around 1220 and was held by the Knights Hospitallers of St John of Jerusalem from about 1230. It was later united with the Preceptory at Maltby. In 1542 it was granted to Charles Duke of Suffolk, and may have continued as an almshouse. It appears to have been located on the west side of the Maud Foster Drain, opposite the present Hospital Bridge. An old house known as Jerusalem House may have been built of material from the hospital, however this has been disputed by the St Leonards Trust who believe the present bedehouses stand on the site of the original hospital.

The parish church is set by the bank of the River Witham, and is thought to predate the foundation of St Botolph's Church in Boston. Dedicated to Saint Nicholas it is a Grade II* listed building dating from the 13th century. It was restored between 1869 and 1875 by Sir George Gilbert Scott, and in 1899 a restoration of the western tower took place. Between 1933 and 1935 a chancel by LT Moore was added.

The Grade II* listed Hussey Tower was a 14- and 15th-century brick tower with an octagonal turret, originally known as Benyington Tower. It was sold to Boston Corporation and dismantled after 1545 when it was forfeited by Lord Hussey.

Boston Workhouse was built in 1837 by George Gilbert Scott. It was built near the site of the medieval hospital of St John. The Grade II listed front range of the workhouse still exists, but the rear ranges were demolished in 1980.

Boston House of correction was in Skirbeck Quarter and was erected in 1809. From 1826 it was only used to hold prisoners for trial, and after 1837 Boston borough gaol became available and Skirbeck House of correction closed. In 1849 it was converted into a lock-up.

Holy Trinity Grade II listed church in Skirbeck Quarter, which was a chapel of ease to Skirbeck, was built 1846–48 by Sir George Gilbert Scott. In 1988 it was added to by John Webster of Leeds.

Saint Thomas Church in Skirbeck Quarter started as a classroom of the original school building in 1866, and in 1885 became a "tin tabernacle". Need for a permanent brick building was recognised and the church was begun in 1909 and completed in 1912. It was built by Temple Moore and is a Grade II listed building.

Skirbeck Woad mill closed down in 1938, the last miller was Thomas Booth.

Destinations

References

External links

Villages in Lincolnshire
Boston, Lincolnshire
Former civil parishes in Lincolnshire